is a Japanese football player. He plays for Verspah Oita.

Club statistics

References

External links

1988 births
Living people
Association football people from Hyōgo Prefecture
Japanese footballers
J1 League players
J2 League players
Japan Football League players
Oita Trinita players
SP Kyoto FC players
Verspah Oita players
Association football defenders